The Maria Goeppert-Mayer Award is an annual prize presented by the American Physical Society in recognition of an outstanding contribution to physics research by a woman. It recognizes and enhances outstanding achievements by women physicists in the early years of their careers.

The prize has been awarded since 1986 and is named after Maria Goeppert-Mayer, Nobel laureate in 1963 with J. Hans D. Jensen and Eugene Paul Wigner. Goeppert-Mayer and Jensen were awarded their prize "for their discovery of the nuclear shell structure".

Goeppert-Mayer was the second woman to receive a Nobel prize in physics after Marie Curie.

Recipients
Source:

 1986: Judith S. Young
 1987: Louise Dolan
 1988: Bonny L. Schumaker
 1989: Cherry A. Murray
 1990: Ellen Williams
 1991: Alice E. White
 1992: Barbara Hope Cooper
 1993: Ewine van Dishoeck
 1994: Laura H. Greene
 1995: Jacqueline Hewitt
 1996: Marjorie Ann Olmstead
 1997: Margaret Murnane
 1998: Elizabeth Beise
 1999: Andrea Ghez
 2000: Sharon Glotzer
 2001: Janet Conrad
 2002: Deborah S. Jin
 2003: Chung-Pei Michele Ma
 2004: Suzanne Staggs
 2005: Yuri Suzuki
 2006: Hui Cao
 2007: Amy Barger
 2008: Vassiliki Kalogera
 2009: Saskia Mioduszewski
 2010: Alessandra Lanzara
 2011: Réka Albert
 2012: Nadya Mason
 2013: Feryal Ozel
 2014: Ana Maria Rey
 2015: Gretchen Campbell
 2016: Henriette Elvang
 2017: Maiken Mikkelsen
 2018: M. Lisa Manning
 2019: Alyson Brooks
 2020: Elisabeth Krause
 2021: Phiala E. Shanahan
 2022: Blakesley Burkhart

See also

 List of physics awards

References

Science awards honoring women
Awards established in 1986
Awards of the American Physical Society